was a city located in Fukuoka Prefecture, Japan. It existed from October 1, 1992, to December 31, 2009.

As of November 2009, the city had an estimated population of 68,583 in the total area of 104.50 km2.

On January 1, 2010, Maebaru, along with the towns of Nijō and Shima (both from Itoshima District), was merged to create the City of Itoshima. Itoshima District was dissolved as a result of this merger.

Notes

External links
 Itoshima official website 
 Maebaru map 

Populated places established in 1992
Populated places disestablished in 2010
Dissolved municipalities of Fukuoka Prefecture